Moovalur Ramamirtham (1883–1962) was a Tamil social reformer, author, and political activist of the Dravidian Movement, who worked for the abolition of the Devadasi system in the Madras Presidency. Born in Thiruvarur, she was brought up at Moovalur, a village near Mayiladhuthurai.

Life

She was the author of the 1936 novel Dasigalin Mosavalai alladhu madhi pettra minor (lit. Devadasis' web of deceit or the minor grown wise) which exposed the plight of the Devadasis. Originally a supporter of the nationalist Indian National Congress, she became a member of Periyar E. V. Ramasamy's Self-Respect Movement after Periyar left the Congress in 1925. In 1930, she supported Muthulakshmi Reddi's failed attempt to abolish the Devadasi system in the Presidency through legislation.

She took part in the Anti-Hindi agitations of 1937-40 and in November 1938, was jailed for six weeks for participating in the agitations. The public awareness created by her novel and her continuous campaign to abolish the Devadasi system, were instrumental in the passage of the Madras Devadasi (Prevention of Dedication) Act or the Devadasi Abolition Bill, which outlawed the practice in 1947. In 1949, she parted ways with Periyar. 

She became a supporter of the Dravida Munnetra Kazhagam (DMK), a new party started by Periyar's protégé C. N. Annadurai. She remained a DMK supporter till her death in 1962. In her memory, the Government of Tamil Nadu has instituted the "Moovalur Ramamirtham Ammal Ninaivu Marriage Assistance Scheme," a social welfare scheme to provide financial assistance to poor women.

References

1883 births
1962 deaths
Dravidian movement
Tamil activists
Tamil-language writers
Women in Tamil Nadu politics
20th-century Indian women politicians
20th-century Indian politicians
19th-century Indian women
19th-century Indian people
Women writers from Tamil Nadu
Indian social reformers
Indian women activists
Indian National Congress politicians from Tamil Nadu
20th-century Indian women writers
20th-century Indian writers
Indian women's rights activists
Activists from Tamil Nadu